Raid De Himalaya is a motorsport started in 1999. It is the world's highest rally raid. The 2009 event ran in six legs from Shimla to Srinagar, between 5 October and 13 October.

Himalayan Motorsport Association
The Himalayan Motorsport Association was formed in 1999 with the aim of conducting motorsporting events in the Himalayan regions of Himachal Pradesh, Jammu and Kashmir and Uttarakhand.

The association is registered as a society under the Registrar of Societies Act 1814 at Shimla where the association has its registered office.

HMA is a non - profit society that donates its surplus income for worthy causes. In 2012, Himalayan Motorsport donated Rs. 10 lakhs to the Deputy Commissioner Leh towards relief work conducted for the victims of the cloudburst that struck Ladakh. HMA also supports Umang, a society in Jaipur that is involved with educating children with special needs. As part of its social responsibility program, HMA organizes rallies for 'blind navigators' in Delhi and Rajasthan.

All members of HMA have been associated with motorsport for the last 20 to 30 years as rally drivers or organizers, across the country. Many are qualified Scrutineers and Stewards who have current Scrutineer and Steward licenses from the FMSCI.

The Himalayan Motorsport Association is a Council Member Club of the Federation of Motorsports Clubs of India (FMSCI), Chennai. About 500 clubs are members of the Federation of which eight are appointed as Council Members.

HMA is the first Indian Club (in 2001) to have its event - the Raid de Himalaya  - inscribed on the International Off Road Rallies Calendar with the FIA (Paris) and the FIM (Geneva). There are 12 such events worldwide and the Raid de Himalaya is one of them.

Internationally reputed to be the "highest motorsport event in the world", the Raid de Himalaya was created by HMA and has been organized and conducted by the club for the past 15 years consecutively.

Other events run by HMA include the Dhorra Kross (Desert 4 x 4 training in Rajasthan)   and the Ice Kross (Snow and Ice 4 x 4 training in Himachal/ Kashmir). Both these events are organized annually and showcase HMA's expertise in the field of cross country driving.

References

External links
 Raid-De-Himalaya Official Site
 Complete coverage, 2007 onward
 Xplorearth

Rally raid races
Motorsport competitions in India
Recurring sporting events established in 1999